Jane English (born 1942 in Boston, Massachusetts) is a philosopher, physicist, photographer, journalist, and translator.

Biography
English received her B.A. in Physics from Mount Holyoke College in 1964 and Ph.D. from the University of Wisconsin–Madison for her work in high energy particle physics. She taught courses in Oriental thought and modern physics at Colorado College.

English collaborated on a translation of the Tao Te Ching of Lao Tsu which she illustrated through photography, in collaboration with her spouse Gia-Fu Feng.

Bibliography 

 "The Ceremony Cards:A Living Introduction to the Traditional Teachings of the Far North from Greenland" (Earth Heart 2014'')
 "Lao Tsu - Tao Te Ching" in collaboration with Gia-Fu Feng (Random House 1972 and 2011)
 "Chuang Tsu - Inner Chapters" in collaboration with Gia-Fu Feng (Random House 1974, Earth Heart 1997, Amber Lotus 2000, Hay House 2014)
 Co-editor with Ben English, Jr. of "Our Mountain Trips, Parts I & II" (Bondcliff Books 2005 & 2007)
 "Different Doorway: Adventures of a Caesarean Born" (Earth Heart 1985)
 Illustrated "Waterchild" (Hunter House, 1980). Jane's photographs of nature and Judith Bolinger's poems of pregnancy.
 Photographic illustration of "Accept This Gift," "A Gift of Peace," and "A Gift of Healing" (Tarcher 1983, 1986, 1988), edited by Frances Vaughan and Roger Walsh
 "Childlessness Transformed" (Earth Heart 1989)
 "Mount Shasta: Where Heaven and Earth Meet," (Earth Heart 1995) with Jenny Coyle
 "Fingers Pointing to the Moon," (Earth Heart 1999)
 "Mount Shasta Reflections," (Amber Lotus 2002) with Renee Casterline
 "Mount Shasta's Black Butte," (Earth Heart 2002) with Bonnie Eddy
Numerous calendars: Tao - 1991 to present, Mt Shasta - 1990 to 2011, IceWisdom 2011-2012

See also
 List of Translators

References

21st-century American physicists
1942 births
Living people
Mount Holyoke College alumni
University of Wisconsin–Madison alumni
Particle physicists
American women physicists
21st-century American women writers
21st-century American translators